The 2016 Kurume Best Amenity Cup was a professional tennis tournament played on outdoor grass courts. It was the twelfth edition of the tournament and part of the 2016 ITF Women's Circuit, offering a total of $50,000 in prize money. It took place in Kurume, Japan, on 16–22 May 2016.

Singles main draw entrants

Seeds 

 1 Rankings as of 9 May 2016.

Other entrants 
The following players received wildcards into the singles main draw:
  Sari Baba
  Kanae Hisami
  Suzuho Oshino
  Kimika Sakata

The following players received entry from the qualifying draw:
  Mana Ayukawa
  Yuki Chiang
  Mai Minokoshi
  Akiko Omae

Champions

Singles

 Kyōka Okamura def.  Nigina Abduraimova, 7–6(12–10), 1–6, 7–5

Doubles

 Hsu Ching-wen /  Ksenia Lykina def.  Dalma Gálfi /  Xu Shilin, 7–6(7–5), 6–2

External links 
 2016 Kurume Best Amenity Cup at ITFtennis.com
 Official website 

2016 ITF Women's Circuit
2016 in Japanese tennis
Kurume Best Amenity Cup